FC Mash'al Mubarek is an Uzbek football club based in Mubarek.

Mash'al means a torch.

History
The club was founded in 1982. Mashʼal played its first years in province league, later in UzSSR league. In 1993 the club started to play in Uzbekistan First League and two years later after 1994 season club gained promotion to Oliy League. In the 2005 season Mashʼal finished runners-up in League after Pakhtakor which is club's highest achievement in history. Mash'al made its debut in AFC Champions League in March 2006, but finished its participation in group stage. The same year club reached Uzbek Cup final, but lost it to Pakhtakor by 2–0.

At the end of 2012 the club ranked 13th and relegated to First League, after playing 11 non-break seasons in top division. One year later, in 2013 with new coach Alexander Khomyakov they gained promotion back to top division.

Domestic history

Continental record

Players

Current squad

Youth squad

Personnel

Current Technical staff

Management

Honours
Uzbek League
Runners-up (1): 2005

Uzbekistan First League
Champions (2): 1994, 2013

Uzbek Cup
Runners-up (1): 2006

UzPFL Cup
Champions (1): 2014

Managerial history

References

External links
 FC Mashal Official site 
 FC Mashal- weltfussballarchiv 
 FC Mashal- soccerway

Association football clubs established in 1984
Football clubs in Uzbekistan
1984 establishments in Uzbekistan